West Tawakoni is a city in Hunt County, Texas, United States. The population was 1,895 at the 2020 census. West Tawakoni is located on the west side of Lake Tawakoni, while its twin city East Tawakoni is located on the east side of the lake in Rains County.

Geography

West Tawakoni is located in southeastern Hunt County at  (32.902544, –96.024452). It is bordered on three sides by Lake Tawakoni, a reservoir on the Sabine River. To the north is the lake's Caddo Inlet, to the south are Waco Bay and Kitsee Inlet, and to the east is the main body of the lake. Texas State Highway 276 passes through the northern part of the city, leading east across the lake  to East Tawakoni and west the same distance to Quinlan.

Demographics

As of the 2020 United States census, there were 1,895 people, 742 households, and 453 families residing in the city.

Education
West Tawakoni is served by the Quinlan Independent School District.

References

External links
City of West Tawakoni official website

Cities in Hunt County, Texas
Cities in Texas
Dallas–Fort Worth metroplex